Wrathrash is the second EP released by the Norwegian black metal band Orcustus. It was released in 2005 on 7" vinyl only, by the US record label Southern Lord, in a limited pressing of 1,500 copies on red and black vinyl.

Track listing
Music written by Taipan (track 1) and Teloch (track 2), lyrics written by Dirge Rep.
"Wrathrash" - 4:12
"Grin of Deceit" - 3:31

Credits
Taipan - vocals and guitars on track 1
Dirge Rep - drums
Tormentor - guitars on track 1
Infernus - bass guitar
Teloch - vocals and guitars on track 2

Produced by Teloch
Mixed by Teloch, Taipan and Vrangsinn (Carpathian Forest)
Cover design by Teloch and Taipan
Artwork by Dirge Rep
Recorded in Horten and Sandnes, Norway, during spring and summer 2005

References

Orcustus albums
2005 EPs
Southern Lord Records EPs